Peddur may refer to:

Pedduru, Kadapa district, a village in Kadapa district,  Andhra Pradesh, India
Peddur, Mahabubnagar district, a village in Mahabubnagar district, Telangana, India
Pedduri, is a surname of some people living in Andhra Pradesh and Telangana.